Amiran Shavadze (born 22 September 1993) is a Georgian Greco-Roman wrestler. In 2020, he won one of the bronze medals in the 60 kg event at the 2020 European Wrestling Championships held in Rome, Italy.

Major results

References

External links 
 

Living people
1993 births
Place of birth missing (living people)
Male sport wrestlers from Georgia (country)
European Wrestling Championships medalists